Chrysoritis beulah, the Beulah's opal, is a butterfly of the family Lycaenidae found only in South Africa.

It has multiple broods over its flight period from October to February.

References

Butterflies described in 1966
Chrysoritis
Endemic butterflies of South Africa